Nilesh Balu Gaikwad (born 10 June 1996) is an Indian professional para-badminton player. He made his international debut in the Uganda Para-Badminton International in 2017, where he won first place in men's doubles for India.

He reached a career-high ranking of 4 in May 2022. Nilesh was always looking for the right pair of shoes for his legs and Nivia Sports made his quest successful by designing special shoes for him.

Achievements 

Gold Medal (Men's Doubles) - Uganda Para Badminton International 2017

Bronze Medal (Mixed Doubles) - Uganda Para Badminton International 2017

Silver Medal (Men's Singles) - Asian Youth Para Games Dubai 2017

Silver medal (Men's Singles) - Uganda Para Badminton International 2021

Bronze Medal (Men's Singles) - Spanish Para Badminton International 2022

Bronze Medal (Men's Singles) - Brazil Para Badminton International 2022

Bronze Medal (Men's Doubles) - Brazil Para Badminton International 2022

Bronze Medal (Men's Singles) - Bahrain Para Badminton International 2022

Bronze Medal (Men's Singles) - Ireland Para Badminton International 2022

Bronze Medal (Men's Doubles) - Ireland Para Badminton International 2022

References

Notes 

1996 births
Living people
Indian male para-badminton players
Indian male badminton players